The recorded history of Andhra Pradesh, one of the 28 states of 21st-century India, begins in the Vedic period. It is mentioned in Sanskrit epics such as the Aitareya Brahmana (800 BCE). Its sixth-century BCE incarnation Assaka lay between the Godavari and Krishna Rivers, one of sixteen mahajanapadas (700–300 BCE). The Satavahanas succeeded them (230 BCE–220 CE), built Amaravati, and reached a zenith under Gautamiputra Satakarni.

After the Satavahanas, the region fragmented into fiefdoms. By the late second century CE, Andhra Ikshvakus ruled along the Krishna River. In the fourth, the Pallava dynasty spread from southern Andhra Pradesh to Tamilakam, and had a capital at Kanchipuram. Their power increased in the reigns of Mahendravarman I (571–630) and Narasimhavarman I (630–668), and dominated northern Tamilakam and the southern Telugu-speaking region until the end of the ninth century.

From 1163 to 1323 the Kakatiya dynasty unified the land and in that golden age Tikkana’s translation of the Mahabharata founded Telugu literature. In 1323 Ghiyath al-Din Tughluq, sultan of Delhi, sent a large army under Ulugh Khan to lay siege to Warangal. After the Kakatiya dynasty fell, the Delhi Sultanate, the Chalukya Chola dynasty (1070–1279) in the south, and the Persio-Tajik sultanate of central India competed for the region. In the end the Musunuri Nayaks won over Delhi.

Under Krishnadevaraya of the Vijayanagara Empire (1336–1646) the Telugus became independent, then the Qutb Shahi dynasty ruled the Bahmani Sultanate there from the early 16th to the end of the 17th centuries, and was tolerant of Telugu culture.

The French, under the Marquis de Bussy-Castelnau, and the English, under Robert Clive, altered the regional polity. In 1765, Clive and the chief and council at Visakhapatnam obtained the Northern Circars from Mughal emperor Shah Alam. The British later defeated Maharaja Vijaya Rama Gajapati Raju of Vizianagaram, in 1792.

Andhra State was created in the year 1953. Potti Sriramulu had campaigned for a state independent of the Madras Presidency, and Tanguturi Prakasam Pantulu social-reform movements led to the founding of Andhra State, with a capital at Kurnool and freedom-fighter Pantulu as its first chief minister. A democracy with two stable political parties and a modern economy emerged under the N. T. Rama Rao.

India became independent in 1947. The Nizam of Hyderabad, Mir Osman Ali Khanto, wanted to remain independent, but in 1948 the Indian Army annexed Hyderabad to the Dominion of India, where it became Hyderabad State. Andhra Pradesh, the first Indian state formed primarily on the basis of language post independence, split off from the Madras Presidency in 1953. Andhra State merged with the Telugu-speaking portion of Hyderabad State in 1956 to create the state of Andhra Pradesh.

The Lok Sabha formed Telangana from ten districts of Andhra Pradesh on 18 February 2014.

Pre-Satavahana period

Chalcolithic age 
The Chalcolithic period is dated using pottery and is believed to be around 1750 BC or earlier. The pottery used for dating the time period was discovered from sites near the Krishna and Tungabhadra rivers such as Patapadu. A painted spouted vessel found there resembles chalcolithic-age vessels from Navdatoli and as far as Bronze Age Crete.

Proto-Historic and Historic periods 

The term Andhra was first mentioned as the name of a tribe in the Aitareya Brahamana, datable to 800 B.C. Andhras left the north of Indian subcontinent near the Yamuna river, crossed the Vindhyas and came to present-day Andhra Pradesh and Telangana. It also mentions that the Andhras were socially parallel to other tribes like the Pundras, Sabarasand Pulindas. There are references to an Andhra kingdom and a people known as the Andhras in Indian epic poetry (the Mahabharata, the Ramayana and the Puranas). In the Mahabharata Rukmi ruled the Vidarbha Kingdom, which included the Deccan Plateau, the foothills of the Vindhya Range, present-day Andhra Pradesh, Maharashtra, Madhya Pradesh and Karnataka and a little-known (now submerged) archipelago in the Bay of Bengal. Rama is said to have lived in the forest around present-day Bhadrachalam during his exile.

Ancient literature indicates a history dating to several centuries BCE, but archaeological evidence exists only from the last two millennia. The fifth-century Kingdom of Pratipalapura, identified with Bhattiprolu in the Guntur district of Andhra Pradesh, may have been the earliest kingdom in South India. Inscriptions suggest that King Kubera ruled Bhattiprolu around 230 BCE.

The script of the Bhattiprolu inscriptions was the progenitor of the Brahmi lipi, which later diversified into modern Telugu scripts.

Middle Kingdoms (3rd century BCE - 12th century CE)

Satavahana dynasty 

As part of the Mauryan Empire during the fourth century BCE, Andhra was a political state in the southeastern Deccan. According to Megasthenes, who visited the court of Chandragupta Maurya (322-297), the Andhras had 30 fortified towns along Godavari River and an army of 1,00,000 infantry, 2,000 cavalry and 1,000 elephants. The military might of Andhras was second only to the Mauryas.

Uninterrupted political and cultural accounts of Andhra Pradesh begin during the rise of the Satavahana dynasty. According to the Matsya Purana, the dynasty had 29 rulers in a 456-year period from the second century BCE to the second century CE. An inscription at Nasik, written at the time of Gautamiputra Satakarni (the 23rd Satavahana ruler), indicates that the kingdom included most of the southern peninsula and southern parts of Maharashtra, Orissa and Madhya Pradesh. The court language used by the Satavahanas was Prakrit, and their kings observed the Vedic religion.

The fall of the Satavahana empire left Andhra in political chaos, and local rulers carved out small kingdoms for themselves. Between 180 and 624 CE, control of Andhra lay with the Ikshvaku, Brihatpalayana, Salankayana, Vishnukundina, Vakataka, Pallava, Ananda Gotrika, Kalinga and other small kingdoms; the most important was Ikshvaku. Sanskrit replaced Prakrit as the inscriptional language at this time.

Ikshvakus 

The Andhra Ikshvakus (Sanskrit: इक्श्वाकू) established a kingdom along the Krishna River in the second half of the second century CE. Their capital was Vijayapuri (Nagarjunakonda). Archaeological evidence indicates that the Ikshvakus succeeded the Satavahanas in the Krishna River valley and may have entered Andhra from the north. The Ikshvakus left inscriptions at Nagarjunakonda, Jaggayyapeta, Amaravati and Bhattiprolu, and their rulers observed the Vedic religion.

Some historians believe that Andhra Ikshvakus were related to the mythological Ikshvakus, while some believe Andhra Ikshvakus to be a local tribe who adopted the title. Some scholars believe that this dynasty was related to the ancient Ikshvakus of the Hindu epics, and Rama of the Ramayana, the incarnation of Vishnu, was descended from the Ikshvaku line. Inscriptions in the Nagarjunakonda valley, Jaggayyapeta and Ramireddipalli provide some support for this hypothesis.

In the Vayu Purana, Manu (the patriarch of ancient India) had nine sons; Ikshvaku, the eldest, founded the Suryavanshi dynasty and ruled from Ayodhya at the beginning of the Treta Yuga. He had 100 sons; the eldest was Vikushi, who succeeded his father as the ruler of Ayodhya. Fifty of Vikushi's brothers founded small principalities in North India, and forty-eight founded kingdoms in the south. In the Dharmamrita, during the lifetime of the 12th tirthankara, Yasodhara (an Ikshvaku prince from the kingdom of Anga) went to Vengi. The prince was so impressed with the region's beauty and fertility that he made it his home and founded the city of Pratipalapura (present-day Bhattiprolu).

In the Puranas, the Andhra Ikshvakus are called Sriparvatiyas (rulers of Sriparvata) and Andhrabhrityas (servants of the Andhras). They were feudal lords of the Satavahanas, and bore the title of Mahatalavara. Although the Puranas cite seven kings ruling Andhra for 100 years, only four are confirmed in inscriptions.

Vashishthiputra Sri Santamula (Santamula I) 
Santamula I founded the Ikshvaku dynasty, performing the Ashvamedha, Agnihotra, Agnistoma and Vajapeya yagnas to proclaim his imperial status. Rulers of subsequent dynasties commonly performed the Ashvamedha yagna to declare their independence.

Virapurushadatta 
Virapurushadatta was the son and successor of Santamula through his wife, Madhari. He had a sister, Adavi Santisri, took a queen from the Saka family of Ujjain and gave his daughter in marriage to a Chutu prince.

Ehuvula Santamula (Santamula II) 
Ehuvula Santamula (Santamula II), Virapurushadata's son, ruled after a short Abhira interregnum.

Rudrapurushadatta 
Rudrapurushadatta was an Ikshvaku ruler mentioned in inscriptions from Gurajala in Guntur district. Possibly a son of Ehuvula Santamula, he ruled for over 11 years.

Brihatpalayanas 
During the third century CE, the Brihatpalayanas ruled northern Andhra from their capital, Kodur, in the Krishna district.

Anandagotrikas 
The Ananda Gotrikas (335-425) ruled coastal Andhra from their capital, Kapotapuram. Their affiliations are unknown. A few Anandagotras families have been discovered in the Anantapur district and Kadiri taluk. It is an old Kadapa district: Hiranya Raajya, in the Puranas. Anandagotras live in Cedaranya of Kadhiri area hill/mountain places called Batrapalli forest, Gogannapeta, Pandava Raju hill and Vankapalli. Old andha/kandarapuram have been demolished. Kambamraayudu mountain hill areas' surname is tatam in patras.

Salankayanas 
From about 300 to 440, after the fall of the Ikshvakus, the Salankayanas ruled part of the east coast from Vengi. Like the Vishnukundinas of Vinukonda who succeeded them, the Salankayanas were vassals of the Pallavas of the southern Telugu and northern Tamil lands. At this time, Telugu and Kannada scripts began to separate from those of other Indian dialects.

Pallavas 
The Pallava dynasty ruled South India from the fourth to the eighth centuries from Kanchipuram in Tamil Nadu. It was ascendant during the reigns of Mahendravarman I (590–630) and Narasimhavarman I (630–668) and included the southern Telugu and the north of the Tamil regions.

The Pallavas were noted for their patronage of Dravidian architecture, examples of which survive in Mahabalipuram. The Chinese traveller Xuanzang visited Kanchipuram under Pallava rule), and extolled its benign government. The period was characterized by conflict with the Chalukyas of Badami in the north and the Tamil states of Chola and Pandyas in the south. During the eighth century, the Pallavas were succeeded by the Chola dynasty.

Vishnukundinas 

The Vishnukundina dynasty ruled in the Deccan and South India in the fifth and sixth centuries CE. According to Edward B. Eastwick, the maharaja of Vizianagaram was a descendant of the maharajas of Udaipur and the Sisodia branch of the Gehlot tribe. A brother of the maharaja of Udaipur migrated to Oudh. Early rulers of the dynasty allied with the Vakatakas and the Rashtrakutas by marriage.

In 529, Madhava Varma (a descendant of the dynasty) and four allied clans achieved independence by defeating the Salankayanas in coastal Andhra. Their capitals were Amaravati and Bezwada before they settled on Vizianagaram. Over the centuries the allied clans were vassals of the Vizianagaram rulers and subsequent dynasties, including the Chalukyas. Kalidindi in Krishna district was held by the Vishnukundina dynasty, although it was later associated with the Rajus.

In 1512, the maharaja of Vizianagaram was conquered by the Golkonda dynasty and was made subahdar of the Northern Circars. The title was conferred by Aurangzeb, who gave the maharaja a split-tipped sword, still part of the Vishnukundina coat of arms). The rajahs of Vizianagaram received the title of Gajapati after the 16th-century Battle of Nandapur in the Northern Circars.

In 1845, the British, represented by Lord Northbrook, conferred several honours on Maharaja Vijaya Rama Gajapati Raju III. On 31 December 1850, Raju III had a son. One of his daughters was married to Maharaj Kumar Singh, a cousin of, and heir-apparent to, the Maharajah of Rewah.

Kalachuris of Chedi 
The Matsyas, Chedis, Pericchedis, Haihayas and Kalachuris may share a common Vedic ancestry and origin myth, but the link is tenuous. In the Puranas, Matsya (Sanskrit for "fish") was the name of a tribe (Meenas) and a state under the Vedic civilisation. The Matsya tribe was founded by a fisherman who became a king. The Mahabharata (V.74.16) describes King Sahaja as a son of Uparichara Vasu, a Chedi king. Vasu ruled the Chedis and the Matsyas, suggesting the Matsya were once part of the Chedi kingdom. The Puranas mention six Matsya kingdoms, and the Pandya Kingdom in the south has a fish on its banner. Signs of the Matsya were later found in the Visakhapatnam region.

Chedi 
The Chedi kingdom, in central and western India, was first ruled by Paurava kings and later by Yadav kings. It corresponds roughly to the present-day Bundelkhand region of Madhya Pradesh.

Haihaya 
The Haihaya kingdom (haya means "horse") was one of a number of kingdoms ruled by Chandravamsha Kshatriya kings in central and western India. The Vishnu Purana links its outlying tribes to the Yadu tribe. According to the Puranas, the Haihaya were divided into the Talajanghas, Vitihotras, Avantis, Tundikeras and Jatas. Haihaya rulers included the legendary Kartavirya Arjuna, a powerful king who defeated Ravana. Although he had a thousand arms, he was felled and his arms severed by Parasurama. The Haihaya capital was Mahishmati, on the banks of the Narmada River in Madhya Pradesh.

Kalachuri 
Kalachuri is the name used by two kingdoms who claim a common ancestry and ruled in a succession of dynasties from the 10th to the 12th centuries. The first kingdom controlled western Madhya Pradesh and Rajasthan in central India. The second, the southern Kalachuri, ruled part of Karnataka. Kalachuri kings, related by marriage to the Chalukyas and Rashtrakutas, and ruled from Tripuri, Gorakhpur, Ratnapur and Rajpur.

The name Kalachuri may derive from kali (long moustache) and churi (sharp knife). The Kalachuri were also known as Katachuris.

In the Telugu epic The Battle of Palnadu, the Kalachuri are referred to as the Haihaya family of the Kona region (Amalapuram), the Razole Taluqs of the present-day East Godavari district, and the Haihaya family of Palanadu. They were vassals of the Chalukyas.

The Pericchedis are also mentioned as vassals of the Chalukyas. According to V. Rama Chandra Rao, they were connected to the ancient Chedi. The Pericchedis had two branches, with Kollipaka and Bezawada their capitals. Rao also mentions that the Vatsavai dynasty of Peddapuram may be related to the Matsya dynasty, since there is evidence of a branch in the Visakhapatnam area.

An 1174 record suggests the Kalachuri dynasty was thought to be founded by Soma, who grew a beard and moustache to save himself from Parashurama's wrath. Their emblem was suvarna vrishabha, a golden bull. The Kalachuri honoured Krantivirya Sahasrarjun, who killed Rishi Jamdagni (Bhagwan Parshurama's father). Historians such as P. B. Desai emphasize the Kalachuris' central-Indian origin.

At their zenith, the Kalachuris ruled parts of Gujarat, Malwa, Konkan and Maharashtra. Their rule was ended by the Badami Chalukyas under Badami Chalukya Magalesa.
Lieutenant colonel James Tod recorded a tribe of Haihayas "near the very top of the valley of Sohagpur in Bagelkhand, aware of their ancient lineage, and though few in number, still celebrated for their valour".

Eastern Chalukyas 
Between 624 and 1323, the Telugu language emerged as a literary medium alongside Prakrit and Sanskrit. From around 848 (during the time of Gunaga Vijayaditya) to the 11th century, the language progressed from stanzas to full literary works. At this time, it was written in old Telugu script; Al-Beruni referred to the script as "Andhri" in his 1000 Kitab Al-Hind. During the 11th century, the Mahabharata was partially translated by court poet Nannaya under the patronage of the Eastern Chalukya ruler Rajaraja Narendra. Modern Telugu script evolved from the old Telugu script from the 11th to the 19th centuries.

The Eastern Chalukyas were a branch of the Chalukyas of Badami. Pulakesin II conquered Vengi (near Eluru) in 624 and installed his brother, Kubja Vishnuvardhana (624-641), as its ruler. The Vishnuvardhana dynasty, known as the Eastern Chalukyas, ruled for nearly four centuries. Vishnuvardhana's domain extended from Srikakulam in the north to Nellore in the south.

Control of the Vengi region shifted from Gunaga Vijayaditya to Rashtrakuta rule, to the Kalyani Chalukya (10th and 11th centuries), and then to the Cholas. In 1118, Kulottunga Chola was defeated by Vikramaditya VI of the Kalyani Chalukya dynasty. The Cholas at Talakad were defeated by the Hoysala ruler, Vishnuvardhana, and Vengi was again ruled by the Chalukyas.

The Kalyani Chalukya fell with the death of Vikramaditya VI. By the end of the 12th century, the Eastern Chalukya empire was divided into three kingdoms: the Hoysala Empire, the Kakatiya Kingdom and the Yadavas.

Chola Empire 

The Chola dynasty, also called Chodas, ruled in Andhra from 500 AD to 1100. Its territory extended from the Maldives in the south to the Godavari River in Andhra Pradesh. The decline of Chalukya dynasty led to the emergence of the Kakatiya dynasty. The Kakatiyas also claimed descent from the Cholas, although some suggest that the word may have been used as a description rather than a statement of varna.  The Renati Chola dynasty ruled Rayalaseema from the fifth to the eleventh centuries from Cuddapa, Jammalamadugu. The Telugu inscription of Telugu Chola ruler Erikal Mutturaju Dhananjaya Varma, known as Erragudipadu Sasanam, was engraved in the 575 century A.D. in the present Kadapa district. It is the earliest record in Telugu. According to K. A. Nilakanta Sastri and M. Venkataramayya's citations about Telugu inscriptions, this is the earliest known Telugu inscription available till now. Erikal is the location name. The Muthuraja kings left various Telugu inscriptions in the Rayalaseema area, such as Punyakumara Mutturaja, Kapi Bola Mutturaja, Gandara Mutturaja, and Vaidumba Mutturaja. The Chodas made marriage alliances with the Vijayanagara Kingdom. Many Polegars also had Choda titles.

Late Medieval and Early Modern period (12th - 18th centuries CE)

Kakatiya dynasty 

The Kakatiya dynasty rose to power during the 12th and 13th centuries. Initially vassals of the Western Chalukyas of Kalyani, they held a small territory near Warangal. Prola II of the Kakatiyas (1110–1158) extended his territory southwards and declared his independence, with Hanumakonda as the capital. His successor, Prataparudra I (1158–1195), increased the holdings eastward to the Godavari delta. Prataparudra built Warangal as a second capital, and countered invasions by the Seuna Yadavas of Devagiri.

The next ruler, Mahadeva, extended the Kakatiyas kingdom to the coast before he was succeeded by Ganapati Deva in 1199. Ganapati Deva was the first ruler since the Satavahana dynasty to unite the Telugu lands. In 1210, Ganapati Deva defeated the Velanati Chodas and extended his empire north to Anakapalle.

Rani Rudrama Devi (died 1289 or 1295), who defended the Kakatiya kingdom against the Cholas and the Seuna Yadavas, is one of the few queens in Indian history. She was succeeded by her grandson, Prataparudra. Although his reign was characterized by battles against internal and external foes, Prataparudra expanded his kingdom west to Raichur and south to Ongole and the Nallamala Hills, all the way to Kanchipuram. He introduced a number of administrative reforms, some of which were adopted in the Vijayanagar empire. Muslim attacks began in 1310, and in 1323 the Kakatiya dynasty fell to the Delhi Sultanate.

Musunuri Nayaks 

The Musunuri Nayaks reclaimed the Telugu lands from the Delhi Sultanate and ruled them for fifty years. Hakka (Harihara) and Bukka, treasury officers at the court of Prataparudra, were inspired by the Musunuri Nayaks to organise Hindu opposition to Muslim invaders.

Prataparudra was captured by the Muslims. Two Telugus, Annaya Mantri and Kolani Rudradeva, united the Nayaks against the invaders. Musunuri Prolaya Nayaka of the Musunuri Nayaks was chosen as their leader. By 1326, Prolaneedu had liberated Warangal. Inspired by the victories of Prolaneedu and his cousin, Kaapaneedu, other states (including Kampili, Hoysala, Dwarasamudram and Araveedu) asserted their independence.

Ulugh Khan captured Harihara and Bukka at Warangal. Converted to Islam, they were sent by the sultan to suppress the Hoysala ruler's rebellion. Instead, the brothers established the Vijayanagara Empire. The Sultan led a large army south, but was halted by an epidemic and Nayak resistance. Kaapaneedu, with the assistance of the Hoysala, liberated Andhra Pradesh.

In 1345 Muslim nobles rebelled against Muhammad bin Tughluq in Devagiri, resulting in the foundation of the Bahmani Sultanate by Hasan Gangu. He assumed the name Alauddin Bahman Shah, and moved his capital to Gulbarga in 1347. With raids and coercion, Singama of the Recherla Nayaks destabilised Alauddin's rule. Kapaya Nayaka forged a treaty with Alauddin and surrendered Kaulas Fort. In 1351, Muhammad bin Tughluq died. Eight years later, Alauddin died and was succeeded by Mohammed Shah. Kapaya Nayaka then sent his son, Vinayaka Deva, to liberate Kaulas Fort and Bhuvanagiri from the Bahmanis; Vijayanagar emperor Bukka Raya assisted Deva in the campaign. Deva initially succeeded, but was eventually defeated, captured and killed.

Kapaya Nayaka persisted, capturing Golconda and Warangal. In 1365, Golconda was chosen as the border between the Bahmani and Warangal kingdoms. Kapaya Nayaka was forced to pay reparations, including a turquoise throne, to Mohammed Shah. In 1370 Anapota Nayaka of the Recherla Nayaks marched against Warangal as part of a Bahmani invasion, and Kapaya Nayaka died in the ensuing battle at Bhimavaram. With Kapaya Nayaka gone, the Bahmanis soon subjugated their allies and ruled Andhra.

Reddy Kingdom 

Prolaya Vema Reddy established the Reddy kingdom. The Reddys ruled from present-day Srikakulam in the north to Kanchi in the south, most of the present-day Andhra and Rayalaseema regions.

The Reddy Kingdom (1326–1448) ruled portions of coastal Andhra Pradesh for over a century. Prolaya Vema Reddy, was the first king of the Reddy dynasty. The capital of the kingdom was Addanki. It was moved to Kondavidu and then later to Rajahmundry. His reign was characterised by the restoration of peace, patronage of the arts and literature and broad development. Errana, the translator of the Mahabharata, lived during this period.

Vijayanagara Empire 

The Vijayanagara Empire was founded by Harihara (Hakka) and Bukka, who were treasury officers in the administration of the Kakatiya dynasty or commanders of Hoysala's forces. When Warangal fell in 1323 the brothers were captured, taken to Delhi and converted to Islam. The Delhi Sultanate sent them to the Deccan as governors of Kampili in the hope that they could deal with the local revolt and invasions by neighboring Hindu kings. Their first campaign was against neighboring Hoysala emperor Veera Ballala III of Dwarasamudra. The brothers later reconverted to Hinduism under the influence of the sage Vidyaranya, and proclaimed independence from the Delhi Sultanate. Some, however, claim that the founders of the empire were Kannadigas stationed in the Tungabhadra region under Veera Ballala III to fight off Muslim invaders.

Harihara I (r. 1336–1356) established his new capital, Vijayanagar, in an easily defended position south of the Tungabhadra River. The empire reached its zenith under Krishnadevaraya in the early 16th century, and Telugu literature developed at this time. Vijayanagar monuments were built across South India, and in Lepakshi, Tirupati and Sri Kalahasti in Andhra Pradesh. The largest and best-known collection of such monuments is at Hampi in present-day Karnataka.

Bahmani and Golconda Sultanates 

In 1323, Delhi sultan Ghiaz-ud-din Tughlaq sent a large army under his son Ulugh Khan (Muhammad bin Tughlaq) to conquer the Telugu country and lay siege to Warangal, which was soon annexed and governed as "Tiling", a provinces of the Deccan. Their rule in Andhra lasted until the 1330s, when 72 nayaka chieftains from Andhra and Telangana rebelled and drove governor Malik Maqbul Tilangani out of Warangal. In 1347, after a revolt against the Delhi Sultanate, an independent Muslim state, the Bahmani Sultanate, was established in South India by Ala-ud-Din Bahman Shah whose successors gradually occupied the Andhra regions by 1471. By the end of the 15th century, the sultanate was plagued with factional strife. Five Shahi sultanates were founded, and the Qutb Shahi dynasty played a major role in the history of the Telugu country. The founder of the dynasty was Quli Qutb Mulk, a Shia Turkmen from Hamadan in Persia. He first migrated to Delhi and then to the Deccan to serve under the Bahmani Sultanate, where he earned the title Qutb-ul-Mulk. Later, when the Bahamani Sultanate declined and was divided into five Deccan sultanates, he gained control over the south-eastern region and founded a sovereign kingdom. He adopted the title of Qutb Shah and his dynasty became known as the Qutb Shahi dynasty.

Qutb Shah occupied the region of Vengi between the Krishna River and the Godavari River after the death of Prataparudra Deva, the Gajapati monarch who ruled the region. However, the advance of Quli Qutb Shah was stopped at the banks of the Godavari by the regional Gajapati Empire feudatory Vishwanath Dev Gajapati and a treaty was signed marking the river as the boundary between the two kingdoms. The treaty was engraved on a copper plate, now in the Nizam Museum. However with the decline of the Gajapatis, Ibrahim Quli Qutb Shah later rescinded the terms of the treaty and invaded Kalinga in 1571 after the death of Vishwanath Dev, and defeated his son the new king, Maharaja Balaram Dev, enforcing a tributary status upon the Nandapur Kingdom. The military conquests of Qutb Shahi Sultans led to the annexation of regions of southern Kalinga into their kingdom and the Sultanate prospered. The rule of the Jeypore Kings over coastal Andhra came to an end when their feudatories of the region claimed independence in the rebellion of Balaram Dev III against his brother the king, Maharaja Ram Chandra Dev I, in 1711. Some of those notable feudatories of Jeypore were - Kurupam, Chemudu, Madugula, Pachipenta, Araku, etc. However, coastal Andhra later became a part of the Nizamate of Hyderabad until the arrival of the British.

Mughal conquest 
In 1687, Aurangazeb invaded and annexed Golconda and appointed a Nizam (governor). The Mughal Nizams controlled Andhra for about 35 years. In 1707 Aurangazeb died, and the Mughal regime weakened and lost control of the provinces. This enabled the British East India Company and the French Compagnie des Indes Orientales to consolidate power in India.

Colonial era (1753-1947 CE) 

In a 1753 decree, Deccan subedar Asif ad-Dawlah Mir Ali Salabat Jang ceded Chicacole, Ellore and Rajahmundry to the Marquis de Bussy-Castelnau. An annual stipend of 200,000 rupees was paid to maintain French troops in the subah; revenue in the Northern Circars amounted to one million rupees a year.Bussy had helped Salabat Jang become subedar of the Deccan. The agreement between the French and Salabat Jang in Aurangabad bears the signature of Said Loukshur, Salabat Jang's minister. Yanam was an important town during the French occupation of the Northern Circars.

In 1758, the French and English fought at Chandurthi in present-day Gollaprolu mandal of East Godavari district. The French were defeated by the British and Salabat Jang made a treaty with the British, giving them the Northern Circars in a firman.

The Nizam later rebelled against the English. The war ended with a second treaty; the Northern Circars remained under the control of British India, and after 1760 the French lost their hold there and throughout South India. In 1765, Robert Clive and the chief and council at Vizagapatam obtained from Mughal emperor Shah Alam a grant for the Northern Circars. During the rule of Hyder Ali and Tipu Sultan, the Kingdom of Mysore pursued an expansionist policy against the Marathas, the Nizam and the English and made incursions into the Rayalaseema region.

The western part of Vishakapatnam district consisted of the Jeypore Estate ruled by king Vikram Dev I (1758-1781). In 1777, the British invaded Jeypore with the help of Vizianagaram and defeated Vikram Dev, turning his kingdom into a zamindari. The region later was reorganized on linguistic lines.

Madras Presidency 

The Northern Circars became part of the British Madras Presidency. The Nizam later ceded five territories (Datta Mandalālu) to the British, which became Rayalaseema. The Nizams retained control of the interior provinces as a princely state, acknowledging British rule in return for local autonomy. The provinces were governed in a feudal manner, with zamindars in areas such as Kulla and elsewhere in the Godavari acting as lords under the Nizam. The zamindari system was dismantled after independence.

Telugu districts 
 Vizagapatam (later Srikakulam, Vizianagaram and Visakhapatnam districts)
 Godavari (later East Godavari district)
 Machilipatnam (later Guntur, Krishna and West Godavari Districts)
 Kurnool
 Nellore
 Cuddapah
 Anantapur

Zamindaris 
 Vizianagaram estate
 Vizagapatam
 Bobbili Estate
 Nuzvid Estate
 Pemmasani clan
 Ravella clan
 Yarlagadda rajas
 Balusu clan
 Mullapudi clan
 Adusumilli clan
 Marni clan
 Indriyal Clan of Rajamahendravaram

Padmanayaka Zamindari 

 Vavilavalasa Inuganty kings
 Siripuram Inuganty kings
 Palakonda
 Kirlampudi
 Kasimkota
 Annavaram
 Nuzividu
 Mylavaram
 Gurazala
 Shri Kalahasti
 Polavaram
 Venkatagiri
 Pithapuram
 Madugula Samasthanam
 Vishakapatanam
 Bhimavaram
 Pachipenta
 Salur

Post-Independence (1947 CE - present) 

In 1947, India gained independence from the United Kingdom. Although the Muslim Nizam of Hyderabad resisted, he was forced to cede his state to India in 1948 to form Hyderabad State. When India became independent, Telugu-speaking people (Urdu is spoken in some parts of Hyderabad and a few other districts of Hyderabad State) were distributed in 22 districts: nine in Hyderabad State, 12 in the Madras Presidency and one in French-controlled Yanam. In 1953 Andhra State was created from part of the Madras Presidency, the first state in India formed on a linguistic basis. In 1956, Andhra State was merged with the Telugu-speaking area of Hyderabad State to form the state of Andhra Pradesh.

Madras Manade movement 
Madras possessed Tamil and Telugu cultures. In the early 1920s, Madras Presidency Chief Minister Panagal Raja said that the Cooum River should be the boundary between the Andhra and Tamil regions. In 1953 Telugu speakers in the former Madras Presidency sought to make Madras the capital of Andhra Pradesh, adopting the slogan Madras manade ("Madras is ours"). However the city of Madras had 65 percentage of Tamil speakers as opposed to 27 percent Telugu speakers that time and Madras stayed with the Tamil state.

Creation of Andhra State 
Activist Potti Sriramulu advocated inclusion of the Telugu-speaking areas of Rayalaseema and Coastal Andhra in an Andhra state. He conducted a hunger strike until Prime Minister Jawaharlal Nehru promised to form an Andhra state. On 19 October 1952, when Nehru's promise had not been fulfilled, Sriramulu began fasting again at Maharshi Bulusu Sambamurthy's Madras home. The Andhra Congress committee disapproved of Sriramulu's hunger strike, but his action became widely known. He died shortly after midnight on 15 December 1952 at 126 Royapettah High Road, Mylapore, Madras, and the house has been preserved.

During Sriramulu's funeral procession, mourners praised his sacrifice. When the procession reached Mount Road, thousands of people joined it and raised banners hailing Sriramulu. Later, they began destroying public property. The news spread quickly, and seven people were killed by police gunfire in Anakapalle and Vijayawada. The unrest continued for several days.

On 19 December 1952, Prime Minister Nehru announced the formation of a separate state for the Telugu-speaking people of the Madras Presidency. On 1 October 1953, eleven districts in the Telugu-speaking portion of Madras State (Coastal Andhra and Rayalaseema) voted to become Andhra State, with Kurnool as their capital. Andhra Kesari Tanguturi Prakasam Pantulu became chief minister of the new Telugu state.

Merger of Hyderabad and Andhra States 

In December 1953, the States Reorganisation Commission convened to create states on linguistic lines. Due to public demand, the commission recommended abolishing Hyderabad State and merging its Marathi-speaking region into Bombay State and its Kannada-speaking region into Mysore State.

The States Reorganisation Commission (SRC) discussed a merger of the Telugu-speaking Telangana region of Hyderabad State and Andhra State. According to Paragraph 374 of the report, "The creation of Vishalandhra is an ideal to which numerous individuals and public bodies, both in Andhra and Telangana, have been passionately attached over a long period of time, and unless there are strong reasons to the contrary, this sentiment is entitled to consideration". About Telangana, paragraph 378 reads: "One of the principal causes of opposition of Vishalandhra also seems to be the apprehension felt by the educationally backward people of Telangana that they may be swamped and exploited by the more advanced people of the coastal areas". In its analysis, the SRC opposed an immediate merger. Paragraph 386 reads, "After taking all these factors into consideration we have come to the conclusion that it will be in the interests of Andhra as well as Telangana, if for the present, the Telangana area is to constitute into a separate State, which may be known as the Hyderabad State with provision for its unification with Andhra after the general elections likely to be held in or about 1961 if by a two thirds majority the legislature of the residuary Hyderabad State expresses itself in favor of such unification". The central government, led by Nehru, merged Andhra State and Telangana to form Andhra Pradesh on 1 November 1956 after ensuring safeguards to Telangana in the form of a gentleman's agreement.

Telangana movement 
1972 and 2009. On 9 December 2009, the Government of India announced the formation of a Telangana state. Protests in the Coastal Andhra and Rayalseema regions took place immediately after the announcement, and on 23 December 2009 the decision was indefinitely deferred. The Telangana movement for statehood continued, with suicides, strikes and protests.

Bifurcation of Andhra Pradesh 

On 30 July 2013, the Congress Working Committee unanimously approved a resolution recommending the formation of a Telangana state. In February 2014, a bill was placed before ParliamentN.Chandrababu Naidu became the chief minister for Andhra Pradesh . The Andhra Pradesh Reorganisation Act, 2014 was passed, allowing the formation of a Telangana state of ten districts from north-western Andhra Pradesh. The bill received the assent of the president, and was published in The Gazette of India on 1 March. The state of Telangana was officially formed on 2 June 2014.

Capitals of Andhra Pradesh 

Amaravati is the legislative capital and the de facto seat of government of Andhra Pradesh. The city is located on the banks of the Krishna River in Guntur District. Built on the southern banks of the Krishna River in the Guntur district, it was selected because it was close to the geographical center of the state.

Amaravati was founded by former Andhra Pradesh Chief Minister N. Chandrababu Naidu in 2014 as the Greenfield administrative capital city of the Andhra Pradesh state, and its foundation stone was laid at Uddandarayunipalem by the Prime Minister of India, Narendra Modi on 22 October 2015.The office of the Chief Minister of Andhra Pradesh has operated from Velagapudi since April 2016. The Andhra Pradesh Legislature remained in Hyderabad until March 2017, when it relocated to newly constructed interim legislative buildings in Velagapudi.

Amaravati, formerly known as Dhānyakatakam, is important in the cultural heritage and history of Andhra Pradesh. Its history dates back to second century BCE, when it was the capital of the Satavahana Dynasty of the Andhras, one of the earliest Indian empires and the ancestral dynasty of Andhra Pradesh. The Satavahanas inaugurated the Telugu New Year  festival Ugadi.

The city once a holy site of Mahayana Buddhism and had a large stupa known as Amaravati Stupa which later fell into ruins. It was the center of Buddhist learning and art, visited by many buddhist followers. Buddhist inscriptions, sculptures and Gautam Buddha Statue remain. Buddhist relics from the region were destroyed or exported to Chennai Museum and the British Museum during the British Raj and can be seen there today. The Amaravati Marbles depict many Buddhist art, inscriptions and buddhist stupas. Along with Nagarjuna Konda is viewed as one of the richest holy sites of Buddhism in all of India.

The capital recorded its first-ever legislation 2,200 years ago. The capital region includes ancient Amaravati. The area was ruled by the Mauryas, Satavahanas, Andhra Ikshvakus, Vishnukundina, Pallavas, Cholas, Kakatiyas, Delhi Sultanate, Reddys, Musunuri Nayaks, Bahmani Sultanate, Vijayanagara Empire, Sultanate of Golconda and Mughal Empire successively before the founding of the Nizam of Hyderabad in 1724. It was ceded to the Kingdom of France in 1750 but was captured by the British in 1759. Guntur returned to the Nizamate in 1768 but was ceded to Britain again in 1788. It was briefly occupied by Hyder Ali, then ruled by Vasireddy Venkatadri Nayudu. It was part of the Madras Presidency during the British colonial period.

Under the Andhra Pradesh Reorganisation Act, 2014, Hyderabad became the capital of the newly-formed state of Telangana, post-bifurcation of Andhra Pradesh. However, Hyderabad would remain as the joint capital of both states for a period not exceeding ten years. Hence, Amaravati is being built to serve as the capital of Andhra Pradesh.

The foundation for the city was laid at Uddandarayunipalem on 22 October 2015. The Prime Minister of India, Narendra Modi; the Chief Minister of Andhra Pradesh, N. Chandrababu Naidu; the Vice President of India and the Chairman of the Rajya Sabha Muppavarapu Venkaiah Naidu; then Governor E. S. L. Narasimhan; the Japanese minister for economy trade and industry, Yosuke Takagi; and the Singaporean Minister for Trade and Industry, S. Iswaran, laid the foundation for the city.

Dynasties 

 Satavahana
 Shakas
 Andhra Ikshvaku
 Brihatpalayana
 Ananda Gotrika
 Vishnukundina
 Kalachuris of Chedi
 Salankayana
 Pallavas
 Vengi
 Pandyan dynasty
 Rashtrakuta dynasty
 Kakatiya dynasty
 Musunuri Nayaks
 Reddy dynasty
 Paricheda
 Qutb Shahi
 Gupta dynasty

See also
 History of Visakhapatnam
 History of India

References

Bibliography 

 
  
 
 
 Sastry, P. V. Parabhrama (1978). N. Ramesan (ed.). The Kākatiyas of Warangal. Hyderabad: Government of Andhra Pradesh. OCLC 252341228.
 
 Talbot, Austin Cynthia (2001), Pre-colonial India in Practice: Society, Region, and Identity in Medieval Andhra, Oxford University Press,

External links 

 Planning Commission Study of Andhra Pradesh's Development and Regional in balances